Edvard Drabløs (1 April 1883 – 29 April 1976) was a Norwegian actor and theatre director.

Biography
Drabløs was born at Sykkylven in Møre og Romsdal, Norway. He was the son of Jens Helgesen Drabløs (1856–1925) and Olave Velle (1852–1917).
He worked most of his professional  career at Det Norske Teatret, from 1912. He was the director of this theatre from 1915 to 1916 and 1950 to 1951. He also appeared in approximately twenty films, beginning in the 1910s through the 1950s.

He was proclaimed Knight, First Class of the Royal Norwegian Order of St. Olav in 1953. Drabløs died in Oslo in 1976 at the age of 93.

Filmography

References

External links

1883 births
1976 deaths
People from Sykkylven
Norwegian male stage actors
Norwegian theatre directors
Norwegian male film actors
Norwegian male silent film actors
20th-century Norwegian male actors